Ľubomír Višňovský (born 11 August 1976) is a Slovak former professional ice hockey defenceman. He began and finished his career with his hometown club, HC Slovan Bratislava. He played 14 seasons in the National Hockey League (NHL) with the Los Angeles Kings, Edmonton Oilers, Anaheim Ducks and the New York Islanders.

Playing career
Prior to joining the NHL, Višňovský played with HC Slovan Bratislava. He was drafted 118th overall in the 2000 NHL Entry Draft by the Los Angeles Kings as their fourth choice. He made the team for the 2000–01 season and was named to the NHL All-Rookie Team after a 39-point campaign, tops among rookie defencemen. Višňovský remained with the Kings for seven seasons, recording a career-high 67 points in 2005–06 and being named to the 2007 NHL All-Star Game. He returned to play in his home country for the locked out 2004–05 season.

On 29 June 2008, Višňovský was traded to the Edmonton Oilers in exchange for forward Jarret Stoll and defenceman Matt Greene, on the day before his no-trade clause would take effect. He was put on the injured reserve on 5 February 2009, after dislocating his shoulder in a game against the Chicago Blackhawks on 3 February. It was later revealed Višňovský required season-ending surgery to repair his labrum.

On 3 March 2010, Višňovský was traded to the Anaheim Ducks for Ryan Whitney and a sixth-round pick in the 2010 NHL Entry Draft. On 4 March 2011, Višňovský scored the first hat trick by a defenceman in Anaheim Ducks history, the third goal coming with four seconds left in overtime.

On 22 June 2012, Višňovský was traded to the New York Islanders for a second round pick in the 2013 NHL Entry Draft. Shortly thereafter, Višňovský filed a grievance through the National Hockey League Players' Association (NHLPA) seeking to void the trade, claiming that the no-trade clause in his original contract with Los Angeles was still valid, since he never revoked it when Edmonton traded him to Anaheim. An arbitrator ruled against Višňovský in this case and the trade was upheld.

The Islanders suspended Višňovský because he did not report to the team for the start of the NHL season. His agent, Neil Sheehy, said on 26 January 2013, that Višňovský will report to the team by 11 February. Višňovský later signed a two-year extension with the Islanders worth $4.75 million per year.

After parts of three seasons with the Islanders, Višňovský left as a free agent and was unsigned over the summer. On 16 September 2015, he was signed to a professional tryout (PTO) contract with the Chicago Blackhawks. Upon his release at the conclusion of training camp by the Blackhawks, Višňovský returned to HC Slovan Bratislava midway into the 2015–16 season, signing a one-year deal on 27 October 2015. Višňovský announced his retirement in March 2016.

Career statistics

Regular season and playoffs

International

Awards and honours

References

External links

 
 Višňovský profile at NHLPA
 
 
 

1976 births
Living people
Anaheim Ducks players
Edmonton Oilers players
HC Slovan Bratislava players
Ice hockey players at the 1998 Winter Olympics
Ice hockey players at the 2002 Winter Olympics
Ice hockey players at the 2006 Winter Olympics
Ice hockey players at the 2010 Winter Olympics
Los Angeles Kings draft picks
Los Angeles Kings players
National Hockey League All-Stars
New York Islanders players
Olympic ice hockey players of Slovakia
Sportspeople from Topoľčany
Slovak ice hockey defencemen
Slovak expatriate ice hockey players in Canada
Slovak expatriate ice hockey players in the United States